Vikas Yadav may refer to:
 Vikas Yadav (murderer)
 Vikas Yadav (cricketer)